Ayinde Augustus (born 27 December 1988) is a United States Virgin Islands international soccer player who plays for the Orlando City U-23, as a midfielder.

Career
Augustus has played for Rovers FC and Central Florida Kraze, now called Orlando City U-23.

He made his international debut for United States Virgin Islands in 2008, and has appeared in FIFA World Cup qualifying matches.

References

1988 births
Living people
United States Virgin Islands soccer players
Association football midfielders
United States Virgin Islands international soccer players